Katerine Moreno de Quintanilla  (born 4 May 1964 in Santa Cruz de la Sierra) is a retired swimmer from Bolivia. She competed in four Summer Olympics for her native South American country, which she lost all, starting in 1980.

References

1974 births
Living people
Bolivian female swimmers
Bolivian female freestyle swimmers
Female backstroke swimmers
Female breaststroke swimmers
Swimmers at the 2003 Pan American Games
Swimmers at the 2007 Pan American Games
Swimmers at the 1988 Summer Olympics
Swimmers at the 2000 Summer Olympics
Swimmers at the 2004 Summer Olympics
Swimmers at the 2008 Summer Olympics
Olympic swimmers of Bolivia
Pan American Games competitors for Bolivia
Sportspeople from Santa Cruz de la Sierra
21st-century Bolivian women